Gao Ziru (508–548 CE) was a Chinese minister and official of Eastern Wei with the courtesy name Xiaoli.

History
He was from Bohai Commandery. Gao Ziru was the son of Gao Qianzhi and the grandson of Gao Chong. He was a minister of Northern Wei and Eastern Wei.
He held many positions. Gao Ziru inherited his father's title, served as Tongzhilang, General Andong, Zhongbing canjun, and served as Imperial Censor of the Palace. He further served as Jian hu shi in Liangzhou, Northern Yuzhou, and Western Yanzhou.

He died in the sixth year of Wuding, aged forty-one.

References

508 births
548 deaths
6th-century Chinese people
6th-century Chinese military personnel
Northern Wei people
Xiongnu